{{speciesbox
|image = Harra (Terminalia chebula) leafless tree at 23 Mile, Duars, WB W IMG 5905.jpg
|image_caption = A leafless T. chebula tree
|genus = Terminalia
|species = chebula
|authority = Retz.
|synonyms =
    {{Plainlist | style = margin-left: 1em; text-indent: -1em; |
Buceras chebula (Retz.) Lyons
Combretum argyrophyllum K.Schum.
Myrobalanus chebula (Retz.) Gaertn.
Myrobalanus gangetica (Roxb.) Kostel.
Myrobalanus tomentella Kuntze
Terminalia acutae
 Walp.Terminalia argyrophylla King & PrainTerminalia gangetica Roxb.Terminalia parviflora ThwaitesTerminalia reticulata RothTerminalia tomentella KurzTerminalia zeylanica Van Heurck & Müll. Arg.
    }}
|synonyms_ref = 
}}Terminalia chebula, commonly known as black- or chebulic myrobalan, is a species of Terminalia, native to South Asia from India and Nepal east to southwest China (Yunnan), and south to Sri Lanka, Malaysia, and Vietnam.Flora of China: Terminalia chebula

In India, it is known as "Harad" in Hindi and Urdu, "Kadukkai" in Tamil, "Hirada" in Marathi, "Hilikha" in Assamese and "Horitoky" in Bengali.

Taxonomy
Swedish naturalist Anders Jahan Retzius described the species.

Many varieties are known, such as:T. c. var. chebula – leaves and shoots hairless, or only hairy when very youngT. c. var. tomentella  – leaves and shoots silvery to orange hairy

They have an acute tip, cordate at the base, margins entire, glabrous above with a yellowish pubescence below. The dull white to yellow flowers are monoecious, and have a strong, unpleasant odour. They are borne in terminal spikes or short panicles. The fruits are smooth ellipsoid to ovoid drupes, yellow to orange-brown in colour, with a single angled stone.

Distribution and habitatTerminalia chebula Is found throughout South and Southeast Asia including in India, Sri Lanka, Bhutan, Nepal, Bangladesh, Myanmar, Cambodia, Laos, Vietnam, Indonesia, Malaysia, Pakistan and Thailand. In China, it is native in W Yunnan and cultivated in Fujian, Guangdong, Guangxi (Nanning), and Taiwan (Nantou).

This tree is wild in forests of Northern India, central provinces and Bengal, common in Madras, Mysore and in the southern part of the Bombay presidency.

Cultivation and uses

This tree yields smallish, ribbed and nut-like fruits which are picked when still green and then pickled, boiled with a little added sugar in their own syrup or used in preserves. The seed of the fruit, which has an elliptical shape, is an abrasive seed enveloped by a fleshy and firm pulp.  Seven types of fruit are recognized (vijaya, rohini, putana, amrita, abhaya, jivanti, and chetaki), based on the region where the fruit is harvested, as well as the colour and shape of the fruit. Generally speaking, the vijaya variety is preferred, which is traditionally grown in the Vindhya Range of west-central India, and has a roundish as opposed to a more angular shape.  The fruit also provides material for tanning leather and dyeing cloth.Terminalia chebula is a main ingredient in the Ayurvedic formulation Triphala which is used for kidney and liver dysfunctions.  The dried fruit is also used in Ayurveda as a purported antitussive, cardiotonic, homeostatic, diuretic, and laxative. It is also used as a soothing agent for dry cough. 

Chemical composition
A number of glycosides have been isolated from haritaki, including the triterpenes arjunglucoside I, arjungenin, and the chebulosides I and II. Other constituents include a coumarin conjugated with gallic acids called chebulin, as well as other phenolic compounds including ellagic acid, 2,4-chebulyl-β-D-glucopyranose, chebulinic acid, gallic acid, ethyl gallate, punicalagin, terflavin A, terchebin, luteolin, and tannic acid. Chebulic acid is a phenolic acid compound isolated from the ripe fruits. Luteic acid can be isolated from the bark.Terminalia chebula also contains terflavin B, a type of tannin, while chebulinic acid is found in the fruits.

 Gallery 

References

External links

  Contains a detailed monograph on Terminalia chebula''(Haritaki; Abhaya) as well as a discussion of health benefits and usage in clinical practice.  Available online at https://web.archive.org/web/20131203001654/http://www.toddcaldecott.com/index.php/herbs/learning-herbs/361-haritak

chebula
Flora of the Indian subcontinent
Flora of Indo-China
Indian spices
Plants used in Ayurveda
Taxa named by Anders Jahan Retzius
Plant dyes